Puységur or Puysegur may refer to:

Places
 Puységur, Gers is a commune in the département of Gers, France
 Puysegur Point, South Island, New Zealand
 Puysegur Trench, an ocean trench off the New Zealand coast

People
 Louis Pierre de Chastenet de Puységur (1727-1807), French soldier
 Jean Auguste de Chastenet de Puységur (1740-1815), French bishop
 Armand Marie Jacques de Chastenet de Puységur (1751-1825), artillery officer, theoretician on animal magnetism
 Edmond Puységur, 20th century French writer